The former Mizpah Presbyterian Church is a building in southeast Portland, Oregon.

This Carpenter Gothic style church is on the National Register of Historic Places and is the oldest structure in Ladd’s Addition.

It was built in 1891 and moved to its current location in Ladd’s Addition in 1911.

An addition at the east end was added to the main structure in 1924, and was used for classrooms and meeting rooms.

The wood-frame structure features a design from the mid-1800's. Above the prominent entryway staircase rises a Basilican bell tower adjacent to the main structure.

In the bell tower is the original bell cast in 1888 by Vanduzen and Tift at the Buckeye Bell Foundry in Cincinnati, Ohio.

It served the Presbyterian community as a church and community center until 1961.  From 1961 to 1978, the structure was rented to several other congregations and organizations, each of which had a short life.  

After 17 years of neglect, it was purchased by Artur Lind in 1978 who converted it over the next two years for use as four residential units.  Lind completed the design work himself, used the 20 foot pews to make railings, staircases, furniture, and accent pieces, and obtained the National Register of Historic Places designation in 1983.

See also
 National Register of Historic Places listings in Southeast Portland, Oregon

References

External links
 
 

1891 establishments in Oregon
Carpenter Gothic church buildings in Oregon
Churches in Portland, Oregon
Churches on the National Register of Historic Places in Oregon
Hosford-Abernethy, Portland, Oregon
National Register of Historic Places in Portland, Oregon
Portland Historic Landmarks
Presbyterian churches in Oregon
Religious buildings and structures completed in 1891